Wareo is a village on the Huon Peninsula, in Kotte Rural LLG, Morobe Province, Papua New Guinea. The village was liberated by the Australian Army during World War II in December 1943.

Populated places in Morobe Province